"865" is a song recorded by American country music singer Morgan Wallen. It was from his second studio album Dangerous: The Double Album.

Background
"865" is an area code for East Tennessee, where Wallen calls home. He is from a small community in Hancock County known as Sneedville.

The song's original title was "919", but Wallen was unsure of the area code and wanted to change it to his area code of "865", he said: "865 is the area code that I use, and if I hear those 3 digits, it takes me back to place or time. It just makes me think of home. I thought it was a unique in the way that they used it."
Therefore the whole number is 865-409-1021.

Charts

Weekly charts

Year-end charts

Certifications

References

2021 songs
Morgan Wallen songs
Song recordings produced by Joey Moi